Chowdhury Harunur Rashid is a Jatiya Party (Ershad) politician and the former Member of Parliament of Chittagong-11.

Career
Rashid was elected to parliament from Chittagong-11 as a Jatiya Party candidate in 1986.

References

Jatiya Party politicians
Living people
3rd Jatiya Sangsad members
Year of birth missing (living people)